HMS Liberty (J391) was a turbine engine-powered  during the Second World War. She survived the war and was sold to Belgium in 1949 as Adrien de Gerlache (M900).

Design and description

The ships' complement consisted of 85 officers and ratings.

The reciprocating ships had two vertical triple-expansion steam engines, each driving one shaft, using steam provided by two Admiralty three-drum boilers.

The Algerine class was armed with a QF  Mk V anti-aircraft gun and four twin-gun mounts for Oerlikon 20 mm cannon. The latter guns were in short supply when the first ships were being completed and they often got a proportion of single mounts. By 1944, single-barrel Bofors 40 mm mounts began replacing the twin 20 mm mounts on a one for one basis. All of the ships were fitted for four throwers and two rails for depth charges.

Construction and career

Service in the Royal Navy 

The ship was ordered on 30 April 1942 at the Harland & Wolff at Belfast, Ireland. She was laid down on 27 November 1943 and launched on 22 August 1944. She was commissioned on 18 January 1945. She joined the 10th Minesweeper Flotilla.

In April 1945, she was deployed with her flotilla for minesweeping in southern North Sea to ensure safe passage of convoys in Nore Command including military convoys to Antwerp as well as in the Thames estuary for traffic in North Sea.

In October 1945, she was deployed for mine clearance in areas near Singapore including ports in Indonesia she was later based at Hong Kong for similar duties. The ship returned to UK and arrived at Portsmouth to be decommissioned and put into the reserve fleet status in July 1946.

She was then sold to Belgium in 1949.

Service in the Belgian Navy 

Liberty was renamed Adrien de Gerlache and was commissioned on 29 November 1949.

His Royal Highness Prince Baudouin in 1950 visited the Adrien de Gerlache.

In 1959, her pennant number was changed to A954.

On 19 September 1965, she departed from Ostend for the Mediterranean off Sardinia, for a NATO exercise. With stopovers in Gibraltar, Palma de Mallorca, Cagliari and Cadiz. Return to Ostend on 28 October.

The ship was decommissioned on 11 June 1970 and sold for to Mr. Bakker P.V.B.A, Bruges for scrap in 1970.

The superstructure is part of the Belgian Naval Academy in Brugge.

References

Bibliography
 
 
 Peter Elliott (1977) Allied Escort Ships of World War II. MacDonald & Janes,

External links
 

 

Algerine-class minesweepers of the Royal Navy
Ships built in Belfast
1943 ships
World War II minesweepers of the United Kingdom
Algerine-class minesweepers of the Belgian Navy